William Livingston ( – after 1713) was a British politician.

He was elected to Parliament as Member of Parliament (MP) for Aberdeen Burghs in a by-election on 8 February 1711. He remained the constituency's MP until the 1713 general election.

References

1650 births
Year of death unknown
British MPs 1710–1713
Members of the Parliament of Great Britain for Scottish constituencies